Interstate 81 (I-81) is an  Interstate Highway. It is also the longest Interstate Highway within the borders of Virginia. It stretches from the Tennessee state line near Bristol to the West Virginia state line near Winchester. It enters Virginia from Bristol, Tennessee, and leaves Virginia into Berkeley County, West Virginia.

Route description

Tennessee to Wytheville

I-81 enters Virginia from Tennessee, where the Interstate continues southwest toward Knoxville. After crossing the state line, the highway effectively becomes the border between Washington County to the northwest and the independent city of Bristol to the southeast. I-81 continues northeast as a six-lane freeway through sparsely populated residential areas on the outskirts of Bristol. The highway immediately comes to a northbound rest area that does not serve trucks, before it reaches an interchange with US Route 58 (US 58) and US 421 that also serve the town of Gate City, the county seat of neighboring Scott County to the west. Eastbound US 58 merges onto northbound I-81 to form a concurrency that continues northeast to a directional stack interchange with the northern terminus of I-381, an auxiliary Interstate Highway that serves downtown Bristol to the south. The freeway heads into a mix of commercial and residential areas where it has interchanges with US 11/US 19 prior to crossing over the Norfolk Southern Railway's Pulaski District, before the route fully enters Washington County. I-81/US 58 narrows to four lanes and heads into wooded rural areas with nearby development, coming to another interchange serving US 11/US 19 as well as an interchange with State Route 611 (SR 611) and a northbound truck rest area, before it passes along the southern edge of the town limits of Abingdon, the county seat of Washington County. South of Abingdon, the freeway interchanges with SR 140, which provides access to US 19 and Virginia Highlands Community College. North of this point are interchanges with US 58 Alternate (US 58 Alt)/SR 75, providing access to the Virginia Creeper Trail and Barter Theatre and with US 11, where eastbound US 58 splits from I-81 continuing east toward the town of Damascus.

I-81 continues northeast from Abingdon along its own alignment, interchanging with SR 704, SR 80 south of the unincorporated village of Meadowview, and SR 737 south of the unincorporated town of Emory. The highway then comes to an interchange with SR 91 in a commercial area, south of the town of Glade Spring that also provides access to the town of Saltville in the north. Past SR 91, the freeway begins to closely parallel US 11 on its southeastern side, reaching an interchange with that route before it curves and enters Smyth County, after which it crosses the Middle Fork of the Holston River and comes to an interchange with SR 107, within the town limits of Chilhowie. Northwest of Chilhowie, I-81 meets US 11/SR 645 at an interchange, southwest of the unincorporated village of Seven Mile Ford, where US 11 parallels the highway closely on the southeast once more. The freeway crosses over US 11, where that route moves to the northwest side of the highway, before reaching a split interchange serving the US Route, located to the southwest of the town of Marion, the county seat of Smyth County. Within Marion, I-81 interchanges with SR 16 that provides access to Mount Rogers National Recreation Area, Emory and Henry College's School of Health Sciences, and Grayson Highlands State Park, before reaching another interchange for US 11 outside the city limits, that also provides access to Hungry Mother State Park. From this point, the freeway is dedicated to Representative William C. Wampler and passes through rural areas of agriculture and rolling hills, with scattered areas of residences and industry. In this area, I-81 has interchanges with US 11 in the unincorporated town of Atkins. It then crosses over US 11 and the Pulaski District rail line and passes a southbound rest area, with SR 683 near the unincorporated village of Groseclose, before passing to the northwest of Mountain Empire Airport prior to coming into Wythe County.

Upon entering Wythe County, I-81 continues to an interchange with the northern terminus of SR 90 north of the town of Rural Retreat, before reaching a northbound cars-only rest area and passing southeast of the Wythe Raceway. Past the racetrack, the freeway travels northeast to a northbound exit and southbound entrance with US 11, located west of the town of Wytheville, the county seat of Wythe County. Inside the town limits of Wytheville, I-81 meets an interchange with the northern terminus of US 21 and US 52, where southbound US 52 joins the freeway in a wrong-way concurrency, before it reaches its southern junction with I-77, which heads north from the highway toward Bluefield and Charleston, West Virginia, at a trumpet interchange.

Wytheville to Roanoke

At this point, I-77 joins I-81/US 52 in a wrong-way concurrency as the route expands to six lanes and deviates slightly to the southeast of its original heading, before picking up US 11 at another trumpet interchange, a short distance later. Northbound US 11 joins the extensive wrong-way concurrency as it crosses the Pulaski District line and zigzags away from Wytheville to an interchange with two state frontage roads, SR F042/SR F043. The median narrows to a Jersey barrier as the freeway comes to an interchange with the southern terminus of SR 121, where southbound US 52 splits from the concurrency to serve the unincorporated town of Fort Chiswell. Shortly afterward, southbound I-77 itself splits from I-81/US 11 at a trumpet interchange and heads south to serve Charlotte, North Carolina. Following the northern junction with I-77, the freeway resumes its northeasterly course, regains its median, and reduces back to four lanes as it comes to an interchange with SR 619 north of the hamlet of Graham's Forge. From here, I-81/US 11 continues to an interchange with another pair of state frontage roads, SR F044/SR F045, before it crosses into Pulaski County. Past the Pulaski County line, the freeway reaches an interchange with SR 100, which heads south toward the town of Hillsville in adjacent Carroll County and where northbound US 11 splits from I-81, which heads north to serve the town of Pulaski, the county seat of Pulaski County. Past this interchange, northbound SR 100 joins I-81 in another concurrency and reaches another interchange with SR 658 in the unincorporated village of Draper. The freeway heads through areas of wooded hills interchanging with the southern terminus of SR 99 near a park and ride lot, before reaching the northern junction with SR 100, where that route splits and provides access to the Wilderness Road Regional Museum, Southwest Virginia Veterans' Cemetery, New River Community College, New River Valley Airport, and the unincorporated town of Newbern as the route heads north to serve the towns of Dublin and Pearisburg; the latter town is the county seat of neighboring Giles County. I-81 again continues by itself, coming to an interchange with SR 660 north of Claytor Lake State Park, before it crosses a bridge dedicated to Trooper Andrew Fox over the New River and leaves Pulaski County.

Immediately past the New River, the freeway becomes the border between Montgomery County to the southeast and the independent city of Radford to the northwest, where it interchanges with SR 232/SR 605. From this point, I-81 fully enters Montgomery County, coming to rest areas in both directions prior to an interchange with SR 177/SR 600, which also provides access to Radford University. The freeway continues and meets an interchange with SR 8 that also provides access to the Montgomery Museum of Art & History and the Blue Ridge Parkway, before entering the town limits of Christiansburg. Shortly afterward, I-81 comes a large cloverleaf interchange for US 11, US 460, and Parkway Drive, where it splits with the outer lanes becoming a collector–distributor road, which US 11/US 460 briefly run along; southbound US 11/westbound US 460 provides to the main campus of Virginia Tech in the nearby town of Blacksburg. A short distance later, northbound US 11/eastbound US 460 split at another interchange and provide access to the communities of Shawsville and Elliston, while the freeway's collector–distributor carriageways ends and it enters widing alignments that heads toward the valley of the Roanoke River. I-81 crosses over Norfolk Southern Railway's Whitethorne District rail line as it continues through mountainous surroundings with no nearby exits, before it comes a distance to reach the next exit with SR 603 northeast of the unincorporated village of Ironto. From here, the freeway crosses Norfolk Southern Railway's Christiansburg District line and the North Fork of the Roanoke River to the west of the confluence with the South Fork of that river, that forms the Roanoke River, and then comes to a northbound rest area before the highway becomes dedicated to Andrew Lewis and crosses into Roanoke County. From this point, I-81 interchanges with SR 647 next to the Dixie Caverns attraction, before it becomes the border between Roanoke County to the northwest and the independent city of Salem to the southeast. Northwest of Salem, the freeway has interchanges at SR 112/SR 619, after crossing an overpass dedicated to Trooper Ricky McCoy with SR 311, that also provides access to Roanoke College, and SR 419 that provides access to the Salem Campus of American National University, the Salem VA Medical Center, and the Salem Fair grounds. Afterward, I-81 fully reenters Roanoke County and comes to a directional stack interchange with I-581/US 220 which lead south to the downtown area of the independent city of Roanoke and Roanoke–Blacksburg Regional Airport, as well as providing access to the Blue Ridge Parkway, Virginia Museum of Transportation, and Virginia Western Community College; I-581 is proposed to become part of I-73 in the future.

Roanoke to Lexington

Past I-581, northbound US 220 joins northbound I-81 in a concurrency, as the routes come to an interchange with SR 115 north of the unincorporated city of Hollins, that also provides access to Hollins University. From this interchange, the freeway comes into Botetourt County, where it becomes dedicated to Andrew Lewis once more, and reaches weigh stations serving both directions of the highway. Beyond the weigh station, I-81/US 220 crosses the Cloverdale Branch of Norfolk Southern Railway's Roanoke District rail line, prior to reaching an interchange with US 11 and northern terminus of US 220 Alt, which heads south toward the unincorporated city of Cloverdale, also providing access to the city of Lynchburg and the National D-Day Memorial via US 460, where northbound US 220 splits ands heads north toward the town of Fincastle, the county seat of Botetourt County, southwest of the town of Troutville. The freeway continues through wooded areas, where it has interchanges SR 640 that provides access to the parallel US 11, after a southbound rest area and passing under US 11, with that route that provides an additional outlet to the Blue Ridge Parkway via SR 43, before crossing the James River, CSX Transportation's James River Subdivision, and SR 43, before reaching a southbound exit and northbound entrance to southbound US 11, northeast of the town of Buchanan. From here, northbound US 11 joins northbound I-81 in a concurrency to reach a full interchange with SR 614, located west of the unincorporated village of Arcadia.

Shortly after this point, the freeway enters Rockbridge County, where northbound US 11 splits at an interchange to the west of the unincorporated village of Natural Bridge, which it also provides access to the town of Glasgow via SR 130 and Natural Bridge State Park. I-81 continues northeast on its own alignment, reaching another interchange for US 11 before entering a steep incline, where the northbound direction gains a third climbing lane. The northbound climbing lane ends as the freeway prepares to interchange with US 60 between the independent cities of Lexington to the west and Buena Vista to the east and also provides access to Southern Virginia University, Washington and Lee University, and Virginia Military Institute campusses. Shortly past US 60, I-81 crosses the Maury River on a bridge dedicated to Master Trooper Jerry L. Hines, before coming to directional stack interchange at the southern junction with I-64, which heads west toward Charleston, West Virginia.

Lexington to Middletown

Past this interchange, eastbound I-64 joins northbound I-81 in a concurrency, where the freeway soon meets an interchange with US 11, a short distance to the northeast. The freeway gains a third northbound lane, before reaching a southbound rest area and an interchange with SR 710 in the unincorporated village of Fairfield, where the extra northbound lane disappears. After interchanging with SR 606 in the unincorporated village of Raphine, that also provides access to the Cyrus McCormick Farm, I-64/I-81 comes into Augusta County and the Shenandoah Battlefields National Historic District, before reaching the next exit at US 11, which provides access to the southern terminus of US 340 northeast of the unincorporated town of Greenville. The freeway continues to interchanges with SR 654 east of unincorporated village of Mint Spring and the southern terminus of SR 262, which also provides access to US 11, before coming a direction stack interchange with the northern junction of I-64, where that eastbound route splits from northbound I-81 and heads toward Richmond, the capital of the commonwealth of Virginia, also providing access to the Blue Ridge Parkway, Skyline Drive, and Shenandoah National Park, as well as the independent cities of Waynesboro and Charlottesville. Shortly past the split with I-64, I-81 becomes the eastern boundary of the independent city of Staunton, crosses over the Buckingham Branch Railroad's North Mountain Subdivision rail line, and reaches an interchange with US 250 that provides access to the Frontier Culture Museum and the Woodrow Wilson Presidential Library, as well as the campusses of the Virginia School for the Deaf and the Blind and Mary Baldwin University. Past US 250, the freeway becomes dedicated to John Lewis and meets an interchange with the northern terminus of the SR 262 loop, that also provides access to the town of Monterey, the county seat of adjacent Highland County via US 250 to the west. From here, I-81 fully comes back into Augusta County, where it interchanges with SR 612 in the unincorporated city of Verona, providing access to the Augusta Military Academy, passes a bidirectional rest area, crosses over the Roanoke District line, and meets another interchange with SR 256 in the unincorporated town of Weyers Cave, that also provides access Blue Ridge Community College and Shenandoah Valley Regional Airport, before it leaves Augusta County.

The freeway enters Rockingham County, where it crosses the North River and meets SR 257/SR 682 at an interchange, east of the town of Mount Crawford that also provides access to Bridgewater College. From this point, I-81 enters commercial areas as it comes into the independent city of Harrisonburg and has its first interchange in that city with US 11 at a trumpet interchange. The freeway continues to cross over the Roanoke District's Chesapeake Western Branch rail line, interchange with SR 253 providing access to the downtown area of Harrisonburg and the James Madison University Convocation Center, before it passes along the southern edge of the campus of James Madison University and reaches an interchange with US 33 that provides another outlet to Skyline Drive and Shenandoah National Park, as well as to the campusses of the Harrisonburg Campus of the American National University and the Eastern Mennonite University. Just after this interchange, I-81 crosses over the Chesapeake Western Branch line again, before leaving Harrisonburg and reentering Rockingham County prior to reaching another trumpet interchange serving US 11. The freeway heads back into rural surroundings, where it meets another interchange with US 11, providing access to the southern terminus of SR 259 serving the towns of Broadway and Timberville, as well as the Endless Caverns site, in the hamlet of Mauzy. Afterward, I-81 continues northeast to another bidirectional rest area and then leaves Rockingham County.

The freeway comes into Shenandoah County and, a short distance later, interchanges with US 211 that provides an additional outlet to Skyline Drive and Shenandoah National Park, as well as the town of New Market, Luray Caverns, New Market Battlefield State Historical Park, and the Virginia Museum of the Civil War. I-81 crosses the North Fork of the Shenandoah River before its interchange with SR 730, that also provides access to US 11 and Shenandoah Caverns. The freeway passes through agricultural areas on the western edge of the town of Mount Jackson prior to crossing the Chesapeake Branch rail line, a tributary of the North Fork of the Shenandoah River, and SR 263, reaching an interchange with SR 292/SR 703 also providing access to the unincorporated city of Basye to the west, via SR 614 and SR 263. I-81 soon interchanges with SR 614 without a southbound exit and northbound entrance in the unincorporated village of Bowmans Crossing, SR 185/SR 675 near the town of Edinburg, providing access to Edinburg Mill, before interchanging with SR 42 within the town of Woodstock, the county seat of Shenandoah County, providing access to Massanutten Military Academy. I-81 continues northeast through wooded surroundings and interchanges with SR 651 northwest of the town of Toms Brook, before it turns more east and passes north of the town of Strasburg. Within the Strasburg area, the freeway interchanges US 48/SR 55, as well as US 11, which provides access to Cedar Creek and Belle Grove National Historical Park, before crossing over CSX Transportation's Shenandoah Subdivision rail line. I-81 then enters Warren County and turns back towards the northeast to its stack interchange with I-66 which heads east toward the town of Front Royal and Washington DC also providing access to the Virginia Inland Port, as well as additional access to Skyline Drive and Shenandoah National Park.

Middletown to West Virginia

Within the I-66 interchange, I-81 enters Frederick County and meets SR 627 west of the unincorporated town of Middletown, that also provides access to Lord Fairfax Community College. Past this interchange, the freeway reaches a weigh station in both directions, before coming to an interchange with SR 277 on the eastern edge of the town of Stephens City, which also provides access to US 340. Soon, I-81 encounters the southern terminus of the SR 37 loop which leads to Romney, West Virginia, and Berkeley Springs, West Virginia, via connections with westbound US 50 and northbound US 522, respectively. SR 37 also provides access to US 11, SR 642, and the Museum of the Shenandoah Valley. From here, the freeway passes through areas of mixed development along the eastern boundary of the independent city of Winchester, reaching its next interchange with US 17, US 50, and US 522, providing access to the Stonewall Jackson's Headquarters Museum site, the campus of Shenandoah University, and the Apple Blossom Mall, the latter two of which are located at the two western corners of the interchange. On the northeastern edge of Winchester, I-81 interchanges with SR 7, which leads east toward the town of Berryville, the county seat of neighboring Clarke County. At this point, the freeway fully reenters Frederick County, as it meets an interchange with US 11, providing an additional outlet to westbound US 50 and northbound US 522, via a connection with the SR 37 loop. I-81 interchanges with SR 672 in the unincorporated village of Clear Brook, before reaching its last exit in the commonwealth of Virginia with SR 669, west of the unincorporated village of White Hall. Afterward, the freeway comes into the state of West Virginia and continues generally northeast toward the city of Martinsburg, the county seat of Berkeley County, which I-81 is completely within throughout its course in West Virginia.

Future

The state has proposed to widen its entire portion of I-81 to a minimum of three or four lanes in each direction to accommodate increased truck traffic and to toll nonpassenger vehicles. Some sections of the new widened highway may completely separate car and truck traffic.

On January 8, 2019, Governor Ralph Northam and Republican lawmakers agreed to a plan to add tolls to I-81 in Virginia in order to fund improvements to I-81 and parallel routes that would reduce traffic jams. Tolls would have been discounted during the overnight hours. This plan faced opposition from business and trucking groups, fearing economic hardship. On January 31, 2019, lawmakers rejected the plan and decided to seek other funding sources.

Exit list

Auxiliary routes

See also

 George Washington and Jefferson National Forests

References
 2007 Rand McNally Atlas

External links

 I-81.org I-81 Corridor in Virginia by VDOT

81
 Virginia
Interstate 081
Interstate 081
Interstate 081
Interstate 081
Interstate 081
Interstate 081
Interstate 081
Interstate 081
Interstate 081
Interstate 081
Interstate 081
Interstate 081
Interstate 081
Interstate 081
Interstate 081
Interstate 081
Interstate 081
Interstate 081